Pine City is a hamlet located in Chemung County, New York, United States. The population was 5,220 at the 2000 census. There is a post office there.

History 
Mount Saviour Monastery was added to the National Register of Historic Places in 2015.

Demographics

References

Hamlets in Chemung County, New York